Tsz Kwan Lau, also known as Lau Tsz Kwan (born 5 February 1996) is a Hong Kong professional squash player. As of February 2018, he was ranked number 121 in the world.

References

1996 births
Living people
Hong Kong male squash players